McCormick Correctional Institution is a state prison for men located in McCormick, McCormick County, South Carolina, owned and operated by the South Carolina Department of Corrections.  

The facility was opened in 1987, and houses 1124 inmates at maximum security.

Notable Inmates

Stephen Ross Kelly - Murdered 18-year old Briana Rabon on February 25, 2014. Sentenced to 50 years without parole. The story was profiled on On the Case with Paula Zahn.

References

Prisons in South Carolina
Buildings and structures in McCormick County, South Carolina
1987 establishments in South Carolina